The Federal Agency for Mineral Resources (Rosnedra) is a federal body that enacts policy and exercises oversight over subsoil use in the Russian Federation. It was formed in 2004 as part of Russia's Ministry of Natural Resources and Environment.

References

External links 
 Official website 

2004 establishments in Russia
Government agencies established in 2004
Government agencies of Russia